Jure Ritlop (born 9 June 1995) is a Slovenian professional basketball player who last played for KK Krka of the Telemach League.

External links
 Profile at abaliga.com
 Profile at eurobasket.com
 Profile at kzs.si

1995 births
Living people
Sportspeople from Maribor
Slovenian men's basketball players
Power forwards (basketball)
KK Krka players
ABA League players